Il Mondo di Stefi (Stefi's World) is an Italian animated series produced by Rai Fiction and The Animation Band and directed by Alessandro Belli. It premiered on Rai 3 on 19 April 2008 and was added to Rai Gulp in March 2009 and RaiSat Smash Girls in May 2009. It is based on the Stefi comics by Grazia Nidasio.

The show's pilot won the Pulcinella Award for Best Pilot at the Cartoons on the Bay festival in 2004. The show was nominated for the Pulcinella Award for Best Children's TV Series at the Cartoons On The Bay festival in 2008.

Characters
Stefi (voiced by Patrizia Salerno)
Valentina (voiced by Maia Orienti)
Cesare (voiced by Alberto Caneva)
Ezio Maria (voiced by Fabrizio Mazzotta)
Papa' (voiced by Nino D'Agata)
Mamma (voiced by Greta Bonetti)

References

External links
Summary on The Animation Band

2008 Italian television series debuts
2000s Italian television series
Italian children's animated television series
Television shows based on comics